Schulenberg may refer to:

Places
 Schulenberg im Oberharz, Lower Saxony, Germany
 Schulenburg, Texas, US

People
 Guillermo Schulenberg (1916–2009), Mexican Christian monk
 Ralf Schulenberg (born 1949), East German footballer